Adony (formerly Duna-Adony; ;  or ) is a town in Fejér County, Hungary.

Twin towns – sister cities

Adony is twinned with:
 Oberweser, Germany (1995)
 Szczekociny, Poland (2001)
 Cehu Silvaniei, Romania (2009)

People 
 Teréz Csillag, actress

References

External links

  in Hungarian
 Aerialphotgraphs of Adony
 The jewish community in Adony On JewishGen website. 

Populated places in Fejér County
Shtetls
Jewish communities in Hungary
Jewish communities destroyed in the Holocaust